Alexander Jovy (born 27 January 1971) is a film director.

He was born in Berlin, but his family soon went to live in Switzerland. Later, he went to England to study Law at the University of Buckingham.

He quit his job as a solicitor in order to direct films, and, with little formal training, he produced a short film called Holiday Romance which was nominated for the Academy Award for Best Live Action Short Film in 1998.

He is currently in a film production group called the Chahaya group. His latest working production is called Cyrus, based on the life of Cyrus the Great, which is claimed to be "the biggest independent financed film in history".

In 2009, Jovy directed The Flirting Club starred actors who auditioned online and were voted for by the public.

In 2011, Garnet Publishing published Jovy's novel I am Cyrus.

References

External links
 

1971 births
Living people
Film people from Berlin
Alumni of the University of Buckingham